Tony Owen (born 18 February 1987) is a British professional boxer from Carshalton who is currently competing in the light welterweight division.

Owen is managed by London-based promoter Michael Helliet (MD of the Mayfair Sporting Club).

Due to the technical ability that Owen possesses as well as the fact that he is a tall rangy southpaw he is considered to be a future prospect and will pose difficulties to opponents in the division.

References

English male boxers
1987 births
Living people
People from Carshalton
Boxers from Greater London
Light-welterweight boxers